Beijing International Table Tennis Tournament was a friendly table tennis tournament in Beijing (usually Peking at the time), China in 1964, 1965, and 1966 which was organized by Chinese Table Tennis Association.

Medalists

Men's singles

Women's singles

Men's doubles

Women's doubles

Mixed doubles

Men's team

Women's team

References 
https://home.kaiqiu.cc/home/space-335067-do-blog-id-158983.html 
https://home.kaiqiu.cc/home/space-335067-do-blog-id-158984.html 
https://home.kaiqiu.cc/home/space-335067-do-blog-id-158985.html 

Table tennis competitions in China